European Parliament elections were held in France for the first time on 10 June 1979. Four parties won seats: the centre right Union for French Democracy the Gaullist Rally for the Republic, the Socialist Party and the French Communist Party. Voter turnout was 61%.

Results

References

France
European Parliament elections in France
Europe